Avanigadda (Assembly constituency) is a constituency in Krishna district of Andhra Pradesh, representing the state legislative assembly in India. It is one of the seven assembly segments of Machilipatnam (Lok Sabha constituency), along with Gannavaram, Gudivada, Pedana, Machilipatnam, Pamarru SC and Penamaluru. Ramesh Babu Simhadri is the present MLA of the constituency, who won the 2019 Andhra Pradesh Legislative Assembly election from YSR Congress Party. In 2019, there were a total of 207,240 electors in the constituency.

Mandals 

The six mandals that form the assembly constituency are:

Members of legislative assembly Avanigadda

Election results

Assembly Elections 2004

Assembly Elections 2009

Assembly elections 2014

Assembly elections 2019

See also 
 List of constituencies of the Andhra Pradesh Legislative Assembly

References 

Assembly constituencies of Andhra Pradesh